The 2011–12 North Sea Cup was the second and final season of the North Sea Cup, the highest level of ice hockey in the Netherlands and Belgium, before the league reverted to its traditional name, the Eredivisie, and its traditional format.

Teams

Teams participating in the league changed before and during the season.  Prior to the start of the season, Nijmegen Devils  announced a one-year hiatus from the North Sea Cup for 2011-2012.  The Belgian team Leuven Chiefs moved from the Belgian National League up to the North Sea Cup for 2011-2012.  An expansion team known as the "Amsterdam Capitals" joined the league, with many of the same people as the defunct Amstel Tijgers of the Dutch Eredivisie.  White Caps Turnhout dropped out of the league midway through the season after it lost most of its players to injury and defections; games played against Turnhout will not be counted in the season standings.

At the end of the season, the Leuven Chiefs announced that they, too, were leaving the North Sea Cup tournament. The North Sea Cup was therefore disbanded and the last remaining Belgian team, HYC Herentals, was admitted as a full member of the "Eredivisie" Dutch league for the 2012-2013 season.

Format
The format of the North Sea Cup was changed for the 2011-2012 season.  The number of regular season games was reduced from 28 to 16, to allow for longer Belgian Cup and Dutch Cup tournaments which are played before the North Sea Cup.  With the loss of Turnhout from the league, the season consisted of 14 games, as each of the eight teams played each other twice.  HYS The Hague edged out Geleen Eaters on goal differential to win the North Sea Cup tournament, as both teams attained 36 points.

The standings of the Dutch teams in the North Sea Cup regular season determined the playoff pools for the quarter-final round of the Dutch National Championship playoffs.  Pool A consisted of the Dutch team ranked first (The Hague), third (Tilburg) and fifth (Friesland), while Pool B consisted of the Dutch teams ranked second (Geleen), fourth (Eindhoven) and sixth (Amsterdam).

The Belgian national championships was determined among the two Belgian teams competing in the North Sea Cup, namely Herentals and Leuven, plus the team that dropped out, Turnhout.  Herentals won all of the games of the round-robin and the finals against Leuven, winning the National Championship.

Regular season

Playoffs

Dutch Championship Semi-Finals
 Geleen beats Tilburg 3 wins to none
 The Hague beats Eindhoven 3 wins to none

Dutch Championship Finals
 Geleen beats The Hague 3 wins to 2

Belgian Championship Finals
 HYC Herentals beats Leuven 3 wins to none

References

External links
 Results at official website

2
North Sea Cup
Neth
Neth